Associazione Sportiva Dilettante Calcio Canelli is an Italian association football club located in Canelli, Piedmont which currently plays in Prima Categoria Piedmont and Aosta Valley group G.

History 
The team was founded in 1922.

The club gained national interest in 2004 after signing two former Italy internationals, Gianluigi Lentini and Diego Fuser, who remained at the club until 2008. Canelli were promoted from Regional Eccellenza league in 2005/2006, and played in Serie D for the first time in 38 years. However, the team was relegated back to Eccellenza after finishing 16th in Serie D and losing in relegation playoffs.

Colors and badge 
The colors of the club are blue and white.

References

Football clubs in Piedmont and Aosta Valley
Association football clubs established in 1922
1922 establishments in Italy
Canelli